The Stijkel Group was a Dutch resistance group that fought the Nazi occupation of the Netherlands during the Second World War. They operated between 1940 and 1942.

In April 1941, forty-three men and four women of the Stijkel Group were betrayed and captured.  Thirty-two were executed in Berlin following a secret trial before a German military court.  The others were sentenced to prison camps.  Following the war, those who had been executed were re-interred in Westduin Cemetery in The Hague, and the present monument was erected.

Han Stijkel

Han Stijkel was the leader of the Stijkel Group. He commanded the group until their betrayal in 1942. He was the first of the group to be executed in Berlin.

References

Sources
 Harald Poelchau, 1949: Die letzten Stunden. Erinnerungen eines Gefängnispfarrers (illustrations by A. Stenbock-Fermor). Berlin: Volk und Welt
 Bert J. Davidson, 2014: Het dagboek van Barend Davidson. Een Zwolse Jood in het verzet (ed. Menno van der Laan). Eindhoven: DATO

External links
Stichting Eregraf Stijkelgroep

Dutch resistance